The 1894 South Dakota Coyotes football team was an American football team that represented the University of South Dakota as an independent during the 1894 college football season. They played 2 games and had a 0–2 record. Both of their games were against Yankton College.

Schedule

References

South Dakota
South Dakota Coyotes football seasons
College football winless seasons